General of the Infantry is a military rank of a General officer in the infantry and refers to:

 General of the Infantry (Austria)
 General of the Infantry (Bulgaria)
 General of the Infantry (Germany), a rank of a general in the German Imperial Army, Reichswehr or Wehrmacht, as well as an official position of the Bundeswehr, held by an officer in the rank of Generalleutnant now and previously of General of the branch, who is responsible for the training and equipment of the infantry.
 General of the Infantry (Imperial Russia), rank of general in the Russian Imperial Army

See also
 General of the Cavalry
 General of the Artillery (disambiguation)
 G.I. (military), a U.S. rank thought to mean "general infantry" but comes from  "galvanized iron"

Infantry
Military ranks